Dance is the eleventh and the most recent official album by SCH from 2007.
The recording line-up was Teno (guitar/synth/vocals/computer) and Azra Pallas (vocals). This electro-dance album, according to Vladimir Horvat of TerapijaNet, avoids "all hybrid commercial traps... [consisting of] 70 minutes of the pure joy of listening... Totally simple yet very sophisticated."

Track listing
 "City"
 "Fly" (an official preview)
 "Great Scrutinizer"
 "Reality Show"
 "Shivering Lap"
 "Europa Galante" (an official preview)
  (from the official SCH YouTube Channel)
 "Ein BosniSCHes Requiem"
 "Our Enemy Goes to Hell"
 "Cradlesong"

References

External links
 SCH Official Discography

SCH (band) albums
2007 albums